The 1983 Taça de Portugal Final was the final match of the 1982–83 Taça de Portugal, the 43rd season of the Taça de Portugal, the premier Portuguese football cup competition organized by the Portuguese Football Federation (FPF). The match was played on 21 August 1983 at the Estádio das Antas in Porto, and opposed two Primeira Liga sides: Benfica and Porto. Benfica defeated Porto 1–0 to claim an eighteenth Taça de Portugal. The final was played at the start of the following season, in August, and was played at F.C. Porto's home ground Estádio das Antas, after huge discussions about the place of the final. In spite of the home soil advantage, Porto could not stop Benfica from winning 1–0.

In Portugal, the final was televised live on RTP. As Benfica claimed both league and cup double in the same season, cup runners-up Porto faced their cup final opponents in the 1983 Supertaça Cândido de Oliveira.

Match

Details

References

1983
Taca
FC Porto matches
S.L. Benfica matches